= Jack Tomlin =

Irish footballer

Personal information
- Full name: John Tomlin
- Date of birth: 1882
- Place of birth: Kildare, Ireland
- Date of death: 1941 (aged 58–59)
- Position: Defender

Senior career*
Years	Team	Apps	(Gls)
1904–1905	Seaham White Star		
1905–1906	Sunderland	13	(1)
1906–1907	Middlesbrough	4	(0)
1907–19??	Murton Red Star		
- * Club domestic league appearances and goals

John Tomlin (1882 – 1941) was an Irish professional footballer who played as a defender for Sunderland.
